Dongnam Health University, previously Dongnam Health College, is a South Korean technical college specializing in the health sciences. Its campus is on the north bank of the Seohocheon in Suwon, Gyeonggi province. The current president is Lee Young Kwon (이영권) and about 40 instructors are employed.

Academics
The college provides training through its five divisions: Health Science (which includes radiology and physical therapy), Social Science (including early childhood education and tourism interpretation), Nursing, Engineering Science, and Home Economics (which consists of the Department of Food and Nutrition).

History
The college opened its doors in 1973 as Dongnam Health Junior School (동남보건전문학교). It became a technical college in 1979. It took its current name in 2009.

Sister schools
The college maintains ties with institutions in five countries: Japan, New Zealand, China, the United States, and Germany.

See also
 List of colleges and universities in South Korea
 Education in South Korea

References

External links
 Official university website, in English and Korean

Universities and colleges in Suwon
1973 establishments in South Korea
Educational institutions established in 1973